The Football League 2008–09, known as the Coca-Cola Football League for sponsorship reasons, was the 17th season under its current league division format. It began in August 2008 and concluded in May 2009, with the promotion play-off finals.

The Football League is contested through three Divisions. The third division of these is League Two. The winner, runner up and third-placed team of League Two will be automatically promoted to Football League One and they will be joined by the winner of the League Two playoff. The bottom two teams in the league will be relegated from the Football League to the Conference National for the 2009–10 season.

Before the season started, Luton Town, Rotherham United and AFC Bournemouth were all docked points for the League Two season for, in all cases, financial problems and additionally, in the case of Luton, for criminal matters regarding transfers of players. Bournemouth and Rotherham both started on −17 points while Luton had to begin on −30 points. On 25 January, Darlington were docked ten points after going into administration.

Changes from last season

From League Two
Promoted to League One
 Milton Keynes Dons
 Peterborough United
 Hereford United
 Stockport County

Relegated to Conference National
 Wrexham
 Mansfield Town

To League Two
Relegated from League One
 Bournemouth
 Gillingham
 Port Vale
 Luton Town

Promoted from Conference National
 Aldershot Town
 Exeter City

League table

Play-offs

Stadia and locations

*Capacity limited to 6,000 because of planning regulations

Results

Top scorers

Monthly awards

Key events
25 February 2009 – Darlington are docked 10 points by the FA for entering administration

2 May 2009 – Brentford crowned Champions of League 2 after 3–1 win at Darlington.

Managerial changes

See also
2008–09 Football League
2008–09 in English football
2008–09 Aldershot Town F.C. season
2008–09 Bradford City A.F.C. season
2008–09 Grimsby Town F.C. season
2008–09 Luton Town F.C. season

References

 
EFL League Two seasons
3
4
Eng